The PalmPilot Personal and PalmPilot Professional are the second generation of Palm PDA devices produced by Palm Inc (then a subsidiary of U.S. Robotics, later 3Com). These devices were launched on March 10, 1997.

Accessories and pricing
Palm also sold the 10201U modem at 14.4 kbit/s, introduced at a price of $129 (this modem is also compatible with the Palm III and Palm IIIx devices).  An upgrade kit was also available, which allowed users of the earlier Pilot 1000/5000 devices to upgrade the OS, ROM, and RAM to match the PalmPilot Professional.  Initially suggested retail prices upon launch were $399 for the PalmPilot Professional (1MB), $299 for the PalmPilot Personal (512KB), and $199 for the Upgrade Kit.  Upgrade kits were also available to existing registered Pilot users for $99 for a limited time after the launch.  These kits included IR capability, a new plastic memory door to accommodate the IR diodes, a memory card with 1 MB, the new ROM for Palm OS 2.0, and a CD-ROM with updated desktop software.

Reception
The PalmPilot became a large success and helped Palm further establish itself as the leader in the growing PDA/handheld PC market. PalmPilot had reportedly sold over 1 million units by 1998.

It was succeeded by Palm III in 1998.

See also
Apple Newton
Tandy Zoomer
iPAQ
Jornada (PDA)

References

External links
U.S. Robotics Announces Two New Models of the Best Selling Pilot Connected Organizer - Press Release, March 10, 1997.

Palm OS devices
Computer-related introductions in 1997
Products introduced in 1997
68k-based mobile devices